Schwing may refer to

People 
Anna-Lena Schwing, German actress
Carl Georg Schwing, German jurist and mayor of Stralsund
Hans-Elmar Schwing, German chess player
Hellmuth Schwing, German infantry commander
Roland Schwing, German politician
William Schwing Patout III, a sugar baron from New Iberia, Louisiana

Companies 
Folmer and Schwing Manufacturing Company, later Graflex
Schwing (company), German manufacturer of concrete pumps and truck mixers
Schwing Stetter, German manufacturer of concrete mixers and concrete transport systems

Other uses 
An exclamation used in the Wayne's World sketches and films
German exonym for Žminj in Croatia